Lithium triethylborohydride is the organoboron compound with the formula LiEt3BH. Commonly referred to as LiTEBH or Superhydride, it is a powerful reducing agent used in organometallic and organic chemistry. It is a colorless or white liquid but is typically marketed and used as a THF solution. The related reducing agent sodium triethylborohydride is commercially available as toluene solutions.

LiBHEt3 is a stronger reducing agent than lithium borohydride and  lithium aluminium hydride.

Preparation
LiBHEt3 is prepared by the reaction of lithium hydride (LiH) and triethylborane (Et3B) in tetrahydrofuran (THF):
LiH + Et3B → LiEt3BH
Its THF solutions are stable indefinitely in the absence of moisture and air.

Reactions
Alkyl halides are reduced to the alkanes by LiBHEt3.

LiBHEt3 reduces a wide range of functional groups, but so do many other hydride reagents.  Instead, LiBHEt3 is reserved for difficult substrates, such as sterically hindered carbonyls, as illustrated by reduction of 2,2,4,4-tetramethyl-3-pentanone. Otherwise, it reduces acid anhydrides to alcohols and the carboxylic acid, not to the diol. Similarly lactones reduce to diols. α,β-Enones undergo 1,4-addition to give lithium enolates. Disulfides reduce to thiols (via thiolates).  LiBHEt3 deprotonates carboxylic acids, but does not reduce the resulting lithium carboxylates.  For similar reasons, epoxides undergo ring-opening upon treatment with LiBHEt3 to give the alcohol. With unsymmetrical epoxides, the reaction can proceed with high regio- and stereo- selectivity, favoring attack at the least hindered position:

Acetals and ketals are not reduced by  LiBHEt3. It can be used in the reductive cleavage of mesylates and tosylates. LiBHEt3 can selectively deprotect tertiary N-acyl groups without affecting secondary amide functionality. It has also shown to reduce aromatic esters to the corresponding alcohols as shown in eq 6 and 7.

LiBHEt3 also reduces pyridine and isoquinolines to piperidines and tetrahydroisoquinolines respectively.
The reduction of β-hydroxysulfinyl imines with catecholborane and  LiBHEt3 produces anti-1,3-amino alcohols shown in (8).

Precautions
LiBHEt3 reacts exothermically, potentially violently, with water, alcohols, and acids, releasing hydrogen and the pyrophoric triethylborane.

References

Borohydrides
Lithium compounds
Organoboranes
Reducing agents